6th New York Film Critics Circle Awards
January ?, 1941(announced December 30, 1940)

The Grapes of Wrath

The 6th New York Film Critics Circle Awards, announced on 30 December 1940, honored the best filmmaking of 1940.

Winners
Best Film:
The Grapes of Wrath
Best Actor:
Charlie Chaplin – The Great Dictator
Best Actress:
Katharine Hepburn – The Philadelphia Story
Best Director:
John Ford – The Grapes of Wrath and The Long Voyage Home
Best Foreign Film:
The Baker's Wife (La femme du boulanger) • France
Special Award:
Walt Disney and Leopold Stokowski – Fantasia

References

External links
1940 Awards

New York Film Critics Circle Awards
New York Film Critics Circle Awards
New York Film Critics Circle Awards
New York Film Critics Circle Awards
New York Film Critics Circle Awards